James Gerald "Jim" Brennan (born 8 May 1977) is a UEFA Pro License-holder Canadian soccer manager, analyst and former player. During his playing career he played as a defender in Canada and England, most notably with Bristol City, Nottingham Forest, Southampton F.C. Norwich City (where he won the 2003–04 Football League First Division) and Toronto FC.

He also earned 49 caps for the Canadian national team, was member of the Canada side which won the 2000 CONCACAF Gold Cup, and later represented his country at the Confederations Cup 2001, the 2002 CONCACAF Gold Cup and the 2005 CONCACAF Gold Cup. He was inducted into the Canada Soccer Hall of Fame in November 2015.

Club career

Bristol City
A left-sided defender who also has played the left side of the midfield, Brennan grew up in Newmarket, Ontario, and started playing with Bristol City youth team in 1994 and made his professional debut in 1996 with Bristol City against cross town rivals Bristol Rovers in the Football League First Division. In 5 years Brennan had five managers including Russell Osman, Benny Lennartsson, Joe Jordan, John Ward and Tony Pulis. In 64 first-team appearances for City over five seasons, Brennan scored three goals. Brennan started his career in the Bristol City youth team and worked his way into the first team before being sold to Nottingham Forest.

Nottingham Forest
Brennan joined Nottingham Forest for £1.5 million in October 1999 and was bought by ex-England captain David Platt. Brennan was the first Canadian-born player to be sold over the 1 million pound mark.  In 146 games played with Forest over four seasons under David Platt and Paul Hart, Brennan scored just once, in a 4–0 victory against Norwich City, the team he would later go on to sign for. While he was recovering from a double hernia he had a short loan spell at Huddersfield with his old manager Joe Jordan. He also came on as a substitute in two league games while on loan to Huddersfield in 2000–01 and received a red card against Birmingham City and headed back to Forest.

Norwich City
Brennan joined Norwich City on a free Bosman transfer in 2003 and was managed by Nigel Worthington. During the 2003–04 season in Division One of the Football League, Brennan scored twice in just nine appearances, as he battled an abductor muscle injury. His goals came against Everton in the FA Cup and Coventry City in the league. Despite his personal struggles with fitness, the season saw Norwich win the First Division title and promotion back to the Premier League.

Southampton
Brennan joined George Burley at Southampton on 27 January 2006 with his contract due to expire in summer having failed to make an impact on the Norwich first team after a series of injuries. However, after finishing his contract he left the club the following May and departed England to play for his hometown team Toronto FC.

Toronto FC
On 8 September 2006, Brennan signed with MLS team Toronto FC for the 2007 season, becoming the first player and captain in club history. Brennan remained captain under Mo Johnston, John Carver, Chris Cummins and Preki. He also became the first Canadian to score for Toronto FC, registering a goal off a free kick against the Columbus Crew on 26 May 2007. This goal subsequently became a Sierra Mist Goal of the Week. Brennan went on to play 27 games, all of them starts, for Toronto FC, the most of any player. He earned a reputation as Toronto's "Iron Man," as he managed to play many of his games despite a rib injury, and looked as though he would go on to play every match of the season. Unfortunately, a knee injury prevented Brennan from achieving this feat. Brennan retained the captaincy for the 2008 season, and nearly managed to score in his team's opening match. Brennan has since added goals in 2008 against Chivas USA in Carson, California and to open the 2009 season at Kansas City, off pass from newly acquired Canadian international teammate Dwayne De Rosario.

Brennan also made an appearance during the 2008 MLS All-Star game in his home stadium, BMO Field. The MLS All-Stars won the game 3–2 against West Ham United. On 6 April 2010 Brennan retired as player to become the assistant general manager for Toronto FC.

International career
Brennan played at the 1993 FIFA U-17 World Championship in Japan, in a team alongside Paul Stalteri and Jason Bent. He then made his senior debut for Canada in an April 1999 friendly match against Northern Ireland and went on to earn a total of 49 caps, scoring 6 goals. He has represented Canada in 10 FIFA World Cup qualification matches. He has played for Canada at the Confederations Cup 2001 and played against Brazil, Cameroon and hosts Japan as well he competed at the 2005 CONCACAF Gold Cup. Brennan won a gold medal in the 2000 CONCACAF Gold Cup defeating Colombia and bronze medal in the 2002 CONCACAF Gold Cup defeating South Korea.

International Goals
Scores and results list Canada's goal tally first.

Coaching career

Toronto FC
Following Brennan's retirement, Toronto FC named him assistant general manager to Mo Johnston. However following the firing of Johnston in the late 2010 season, Brennan's position remained unknown with the club until the new management team was put in place. It included Paul Mariner as director of player development and Aron Winter as head coach. On 1 March 2011, the club announced that the new position of Brennan within the club would be as head coach of the Toronto FC Academy U-17 team in the Second Division of the Canadian Soccer League; his first coaching position.

On 14 May 2012, Brennan was promoted to first-team assistant coach under Aron Winter. On 28 September 2013, Brennan filled in for Toronto FC head coach Ryan Nelsen who was serving a suspension. In August 2014, Brennan was fired along with Nelsen and the rest of the club's first-team staff.

Aurora FC
In March 2015, Brennan became the executive director and director of soccer operations at the Aurora Youth Soccer Club. Under his leadership the club was renamed Aurora FC and gained entry into the semi-professional League1 Ontario.
He created Aurora FC's slogan One Style, One Passion. He coached his sons' 2008 Boys team for about 4 years.  He later departed the club in December 2017.
He stopped coaching the 2008 boys in late December 2018.

York United
In 2018, Brennan joined Carlo Baldassarra and Preben Ganzhorn to found the company that owns the Canadian Premier League club York9 FC. On 27 July 2018, York9 FC announced Brennan would serve as the club's first head coach as well as executive vice president of soccer operations. On 11 December 2020, the club rebranded as York United FC.

On 23 November 2021, York United announced that they had parted ways with Brennan with his contract with the club already due to expire prior to the start of the 2022 season.

Personal life
Brennan's father is from Ireland, while his mother is from Scotland.

Honours

Player
Bristol City
Football League One runners up: 1997–98

Norwich City 
Football League First Division champions: 2003–04

Toronto
Canadian Championship winners: 2009

Canada
 CONCACAF Gold Cup: 2000
 CONCACAF U-20 Championship: 1996
 Canadian Soccer Hall of Fame: 2014 – 2000 CONCACAF Gold Cup Squad

Individual
Canadian Player of the Year: 1999
Confederation Cup All-Star Team: 2001
Toronto FC Player of the Year: 2007
Red Patch Boys Player of the Year: 2007
Toronto FC Defender of the Year: 2008
2008 MLS All-Star Game: 2008
Toronto FC Humanitarian of the Year: 2009
Canadian Soccer Hall of Fame: 2015

References

External links

 / Canada Soccer Hall of Fame
 MLS player profile
 
 Career information at ex-canaries.co.uk
 2007 U-Sector TFC Player of the Year – Jim Brennan
 

1977 births
Living people
Association football defenders
Canadian soccer players
People from East York, Toronto
Soccer players from Toronto
Canadian people of Irish descent
Canadian people of Scottish descent
Canada Soccer Hall of Fame inductees
Canadian expatriate soccer players
Expatriate footballers in England
Canadian expatriate sportspeople in England
Bristol City F.C. players
Nottingham Forest F.C. players
Huddersfield Town A.F.C. players
Norwich City F.C. players
Southampton F.C. players
Toronto FC players
Canadian Soccer League (1998–present) managers
English Football League players
Premier League players
Major League Soccer players
Major League Soccer All-Stars
Canada men's international soccer players
CONCACAF Gold Cup-winning players
2000 CONCACAF Gold Cup players
2001 FIFA Confederations Cup players
2002 CONCACAF Gold Cup players
2005 CONCACAF Gold Cup players
Major League Soccer broadcasters
Canadian soccer coaches
Toronto FC non-playing staff
York United FC non-playing staff
York United FC coaches
Canadian Premier League coaches